Himalaya Airlines is a Nepalese airline operating from Tribhuvan International Airport in Kathmandu, Nepal. Himalaya Airlines was founded in 2014 as a joint venture between Yeti World Investment Group and Tibet Airlines. It launched operations in May 2016 with a single Airbus A320. The airline flies to eight destinations as of January 2022.

History
Himalaya Airlines is the second attempt of Yeti Airlines Group to launch an international airline based in Nepal, following the collapse of Fly Yeti in 2008. It is also the second Sino-Nepali airline company after Flying Dragon Airlines. Alongside Yeti Airlines, which managed the airline through Yeti World Investment, Tibet Airlines and the Himalaya Infrastructure Fund Aviation Investment Company had stakes in the airline.

In order to obtain its air operator's certificate, Himalaya Airlines leased a Jetstream 41 aircraft from Yeti Airlines and conducted its first proving flights in February 2015. Launch plans were delayed by the April 2015 Nepal earthquake. The airline inducted its first aircraft, an Airbus A320, on 9 March 2016 and launched operations on 31 May 2016, with flights between Kathmandu and Doha. Flights from Kathmandu to Colombo started in October 2016, marking the resumption of scheduled flights between Nepal and Sri Lanka after 28 years but the flights were soon suspended.

In 2016, Himalaya Airlines served as the governmental aircraft of Nepal, when Prime Minister Khadga Prasad Oli used Himalaya's services on his inaugural visit to China. This was the first time that the head of the Nepalese Government did not use state owned airline; resulting public outcry.

The airline initially focused on unconventional routes; such as Yangon, Myanmar and Colombo, Sri Lanka as opposed to highly demanded middle-eastern destinations but they were quickly terminated.  After all, Himalaya ended up operating to Dammam, Saudi Arabia as well as Abu Dhabi and Dubai in the United Arab Emirates.  In the months leading to Nepal Tourism Board's Visit Nepal 2020 tourism promotion campaign, Himalaya Airlines focused on the market in China, as Chinese were ranked second among the most number of travellers that visit to Nepal. In October 2019, Himalaya Airlines launched direct service to Beijing's newly constructed Daxing International Airport making it the only airline in Nepal to connect the capitals of Nepal and China.

Despite focusing on the Chinese Market, Himalaya Airlines discontinued all flights to China on February 2020 due to the first outbreak of the Coronavirus. During the COVID-19 pandemic in Nepal, Himalaya Airlines carried out rescue and evacuation charter flights while all of its scheduled flights were grounded from March 2020.

Corporate affairs
At the time of its establishment, Tibet Airlines held a 49% stake in Himalaya Airlines, while Yeti World Investment, an affiliate of Yeti Airlines Group owned the remaining 51%. Zhao Guo Qiang was the airline's first president while Ang Tshering Sherpa served as chairman of the board until his death in 2019.

In September 2019, Himalaya Airlines underwent ownership restructuring, for which the shares of Tibet Airlines were transferred to Tibet Civil Aviation Development and Investment. Subsequently, the logo and livery were changed. The blue, dark blue as well as white blend of livery and logo was changed with orange and blue combination. Though, the fuselage retained its white color. Currently, Zhou Enyong serves as the president of Himalaya Airlines.

The airline is headquartered in Gairidhara, Kathmandu.

Destinations

Himalaya Airlines serves the following destinations as of November 2022:

Fleet 

Himalaya Airlines operates the following aircraft as of November 2022:

Services

Economy Class 

Premium Economy Class
Himalaya Airlines was the first airline in Nepal to introduce a Premium Economy class. It consists of 8 seats on their Airbus A320 with a four-abreast configuration. In 2020, this section of the aircraft was rebranded as the airlines' Business Class but has since been depricated.

References

External links
 

Airlines of Nepal
Airlines established in 2014
Airlines banned in the European Union
2014 establishments in Nepal